Réka Szilágyi (born 19 January 1996) is a Hungarian athlete specialising in the javelin throw. She represented her country at the 2019 World Championships without qualifying for the final. Earlier that year she finished fourth the 2019 Summer Universiade.

Her personal best in the event is 62.45 metres set in Hungary in 2020.

International competitions

References

1996 births
Living people
Hungarian female javelin throwers
World Athletics Championships athletes for Hungary
Competitors at the 2017 Summer Universiade
Competitors at the 2019 Summer Universiade
Athletes (track and field) at the 2020 Summer Olympics
Olympic athletes of Hungary
People from Szolnok
Sportspeople from Jász-Nagykun-Szolnok County